A1 Team Czech Republic is the defunct Czech team of A1 Grand Prix, an international racing series. Although no official announcement was made, the team's flag icon was removed from the A1GP website, and they do not appear in the 2008–09 season results page.

Management 

The A1 Team Czech Republic seat holder is Antonin Charouz.

History

2007–08 season 

Drivers: Tomáš Enge, Erik Janiš, Josef Král, Filip Salaquarda

The team fared worse in 2007–08, scoring in just three events, and finishing 19th overall.

2006–07 season 

Drivers: Jan Charouz, Tomáš Enge, Jaroslav Janiš, Tomáš Kostka, Filip Salaquarda

Although the team scored on less occasions, the team still finished in 12th position, including a podium in their home race.

2005–06 season 

Drivers: Jan Charouz, Tomáš Enge

Good, consistent results, including a victory and two podiums, brought the team to 12th position in the final standings.

Drivers

Complete A1 Grand Prix results 

(key), "spr" indicate a Sprint Race, "fea" indicate a Main Race.

References

External links
A1 Team Czech Republic Web Site
Racing Charouz team
A1gp.com Official A1 Grand Prix Web Site

Czech Republic A1 team
National sports teams of the Czech Republic
Motorsport in the Czech Republic
Auto racing teams established in 2005
Auto racing teams disestablished in 2008